The Battle of Pacocha was a naval battle that took place on 29 May 1877 between the rebel-held Peruvian monitor Huáscar and the British ships  and . The vessels did not inflict significant damage on each other, however the battle is notable for seeing the first combat use of the self-propelled torpedo.

Background 
In May 1877, Nicolás de Piérola, former Minister of Finance, initiated an attempt to overthrow then-President Mariano Ignacio Prado. As part of this coup attempt, on 6 May two of his supporters, Colonel Lorranaga and Major Echenique, boarded Huáscar at the port of Callao while the captain and executive officer were ashore. Officers remaining on the ship were part of the plot and persuaded the crew to join their cause. Now in rebel hands, Huáscar put to sea with Luis Germán Astete in command. Other Peruvian naval ships present in the port, such as Atahualpa, were in a state of disrepair and unable to pursue.

The rebels used the ship to harass commercial shipping, especially off Callao, the main commercial port of Peru. However, after she forcibly boarded some British merchant ships, British authorities sent HMS Shah and HMS Amethyst, under command of Rear Admiral Algernon de Horsey, to capture the vessel, with authorization and reward offered by the Peruvian government of Mariano Ignacio Prado.

On May 16, it appeared in the port of Antofagasta, Bolivia, where he picked up Nicolás de Piérola, as Supreme Chief of Peru, and his entourage of followers..

Battle 
Huáscar escaped after a fierce exchange of fire. Her guns were undermanned, and she fired just 40 rounds. Shahs mast was damaged by splinters. On the British side, Shah fired 237 shots and Amethyst 190, but they carried no armour-piercing ammunition. Huáscar was hit 60 times, but her armour shield caused all the shots to bounce off harmlessly. In a last-ditch effort to sink Huáscar, two small torpedo rams from Shah attempted to torpedo her, but Huáscar escaped under the cover of darkness. The rebel crew was forced to surrender their ship to the Peruvian government ships squadron just two days later.

This battle saw the first use of the newly invented self-propelled torpedo, which at the time had just entered limited service with the Royal Navy. The ironclad Huáscar evaded the torpedo.

Importance 

This combat was the first and only time that a Peruvian ship was able to combat Royal Navy ships to a draw. Rear Admiral De Horsey was requested by the British Parliament as a result of this incident, the news of which went around the world and filled the Peruvian sailors with pride.

It was important because it was the first time a self-propelled Whitehead torpedo was used in combat, which was later used by the Russians during the Russo-Turkish War of 1877–1878. On the firsts of the occasions this torpedo was useless, because in the day it was easy to dodge them, as easy as the British ships avoided the Huáscar spur, although the Russians managed to sink the Turkish steam Intibah.

The combat also proved the inefficiency of the English cruisers, even though they had a well-trained crew, which as a whole was superior to that of the Huáscar (837 men versus 179), advantage in powerful guns and attack from two flanks at the same time. It was shown that it was necessary for these types of cruisers to have some armored protection, giving rise to the so-called protected cruisers, although Chile and France navies were the first to have this type of ship.

The Huáscar also used self-propelled torpedoes during the War of the Pacific in the :es:Segundo Combate de Antofagasta in 1879, but it was the north-american Lay torpedo system, which was electrically directed with wires but never had a successful application. And, the first time a self-propelled torpedo was successfully used against a warship was in a night action, paradoxically the Huáscar witnessed the event, when the Blanco Encalada armored vessel was sunk in 1891, by two torpedo-gunboat destroyers that fired 5 self-propelled torpedoes, hitting the last one.

References

External links 
Britons And Peruvians Fight At Sea

Naval battles involving the United Kingdom
Naval battles involving Peru
Conflicts in 1877
International maritime incidents
Peru–United Kingdom relations
Maritime incidents in May 1877